The Mirador del Estrecho is a scenic overlook over the Strait of Gibraltar located within the municipal borders of Tarifa, Spain,  from its urban centre.

The scenic overlook provides outstanding views over the Strait of Gibraltar and the African coast just opposite. On clear days, it is possible to have an uninterrupted view of the Spanish city of Ceuta (with Monte Hacho), at the East end of the coast (to the left); Jebel Musa, the highest elevation on the coast (the most likely African Pillar of Hercules, Abyla); and the Moroccan port of Tanger-Med (to the right of Jebel Musa).

External links 

Tourist attractions in Andalusia
Strait of Gibraltar
Tarifa
Scenic viewpoints in Spain